The Art of War is an EP by the Polish death metal band Vader. It was released on 14 November 2005 by Regain Records in Europe, and Mystic Production in Poland. Japanese edition was released on 23 November 2005 by Avalon Marquee, and contains bonus track "Die!!!! (Giń Psie)".

The Art of War was recorded in early 2005 at Hertz Studio in Białystok, Poland produced by Wojtek & Sławek Wiesławscy. Photo session was made by Krzysztof "Sado" Sadowski, and it took place at Błędów Desert in Poland. A music video was shot for the song "This Is the War" which was produced and directed by Arkadiusz Jurcan. Screenshots from video have been used as cover art, and layout. The EP is the first Vader release that features guitarist Maurycy "Mauser" Stefanowicz as composer.

Tracks "Para Bellum" and "Banners on the Wind" are intros created by Krzysztof "Siegmar" Oloś from the symphonic black metal band Vesania. It is dedicated to a former drummer of Vader, Krzysztof "Docent" Raczkowski, who died approximately three months before this EP's release.

Track listing

Personnel 
Production and performance credits are adapted from the album liner notes.

Release history

References 

2005 EPs
Vader (band) albums
Mystic Production albums
Regain Records albums
Candlelight Records albums
Polish-language albums